Bojańczyk is a Polish-language surname.

People with the surname include:
 Mikołaj Bojańczyk (born 1977), Polish computer scientist and logician
 Piotr Bojańczyk (born 1946), Polish ice dancer

See also 
 Jerzy Bojańczyk's Brewery in Włocławek

Polish-language surnames